Vitalisia is a genus of grasshoppers in the subfamily Acridinae, with no tribe assigned.  Two species have been recorded from Indochina from Bangladesh to peninsular Malaysia.

Species
The Orthoptera Species File includes:
 Vitalisia bangiensus Mahmood, Samira & Idris, 2007
 Vitalisia cerambycina Bolívar, 1914 – type species

Cerambycidae
Vitalisia Pic (1924) is an invalid junior homonym, applied to a genus of beetles in the family Cerambycidae. The genus of beetles with this name is in the family Cerambycidae, tribe Apomecynini; species were originally placed in the genus Zotale, which is presently treated as a subgenus within Mycerinopsis (e.g.,).

See also
 Vitalisia alternata, a species of Longhorn beetle
 Vitalisia sumatrana, another species of Longhorn beetle

References

Acridinae